Action Christian National (ACN) was a white nationalist political party in Namibia (formerly South West Africa). The ACN was established in 1989 to enable whites to participate in the elections. It used to be aligned with the National Party of South Africa. In the Namibian parliamentary election, 1989 that elected the members of the Constituent Assembly of Namibia, ACN won three seats. The party's chairman was Jan de Wet. It subsequently became the Monitor Action Group.

See also

 List of political parties in Namibia

References

Defunct political parties in Namibia
Political parties established in 1989
White nationalism in Namibia
White nationalist parties
Nationalist parties in Africa
Ethnic political parties
Conservative parties in Namibia
1989 establishments in South West Africa
Protestant political parties